Upshur may refer to:

Places:
Upshur County, Texas, county located in the U.S. state of Texas
Upshur County, West Virginia, county located in the U.S. state of West Virginia

Surname:
Abel P. Upshur (1790–1844), American lawyer,  Secretary of the Navy and Secretary of State
Franklin Upshur (1875–1965), American politician and lawyer
George M. Upshur (1847–1924), American politician and lawyer
George P. Upshur (1799–1852), officer in the United States Navy, brother of Abel P. Upshur
John Henry Upshur (1823–1917), admiral in the United States Navy in the Mexican-American War and American Civil War
Ross Upshur, FRCPC, Canadian physician and researcher
William P. Upshur (1881–1943), recipient of the Medal of Honor—for actions in 1915 during the Haitian Campaign

Fictional Characters:
 Miles Upshur, main protagonist in the 2013 survival horror video game Outlast.

Given name:
John Upshur Dennis Page (1904–1950), United States Army officer from Saint Paul, Minnesota
Robert "Bob" Upshur Woodward (born 1943), American investigative journalist and non-fiction author

Ships:
USS Abel P. Upshur (DD-193), Clemson class destroyer in the United States Navy
USS Upshur (DD-144), Wickes class destroyer in the United States Navy
USNS Upshur (T-AP-198), Barrett class transport ship of the United States Navy